Hank Williams Sings is the debut album by American country music singer-songwriter Hank Williams. It was released by MGM Records on November 9, 1951.

Background
By 1951, Hank Williams' popularity had soared. Following the chart topping records "Cold, Cold Heart" and "Hey Good Lookin", he joined the Hadacol caravan, a train-transported road show that toured the South in a forty-nine dates one night show schedule. After the tour disbanded before the shows were completed, Williams returned to Nashville, Tennessee. In September 1951, he traveled to Hollywood after being offered a part as the Sheriff in Small Town Girl. Ultimately, Williams did not participate in the movie.  On November 14, Williams was invited to The Perry Como Chesterfield Show. Anticipating the show, and the possible record sales that it could propel, MGM Records released Hank Williams Sings.

Recording and composition

The songs were recorded by Williams during sessions between 1946 and 1949. Producer Fred Rose took songs from previous single releases that did not sell well at the moment of their release.  As Williams biographer Colin Escott put it: "Rose used Hank's first album as a dump site for oddball tracks that hadn't sold elsewhere.  With the exception of "Wedding Bells", the tracks were the dogs of Hank's catalog, like "I've Just Told Mama Goodbye", "Wealth Won't Save Your Soul", and "Six More Miles".

Billboard theorized that the label had decided not to release an album with new sides because it "would only spread jockey and juke plays too thinly instead of getting the concentrated push on a single record".   The LP contains two indisputable Hank Williams classics: the album opener "Lost Highway," which was composed by blind Texas honky tonk singer and songwriter Leon Payne, and the gospel standard "I Saw the Light," which Williams usually sang to close his shows.  Five of the album's eight tracks were composed by Williams, with the only legitimate hit being "Wedding Bells," which hit #2 in 1949.  "A Mansion on the Hill" failed to make the Top 10 in late 1948, peaking at #12.  None of the remaining songs (mostly B-sides) charted at all.  "Wealth Won't Save Your Soul" had actually been recorded for Sterling Records and released as Hank's second single before he moved to MGM in April 1947.

The album was released in three formats: ten-inch LP, a four 45rpm packaged set and a four 78rpm set. It failed to chart, partly because singles, rather than LPs, were emphasized in the country music business due in large part to the valuable jukebox trade.

Track listing

Personnel
Hank Williams -vocals, guitar
Zeb Turner - lead guitar
Zeke Turner - lead guitar
Louis Innis - bass, rhythm guitar
Jack Shook - rhythm guitar 
James "Guy" Willis - guitar
Tommy Jackson - fiddle 
Dale Potter - fiddle
Charles "Skeeter" Willis - fiddle
Chubby Wise - fiddle 
Jerry Byrd - steel guitar
Don Davis - steel guitar
Dale "Smokey" Lohman - steel guitar 
Ernie Newton - bass
Bronson "Brownie" Reynolds - bass
Velma Williams Smith - bass
Charles "Indian" Wright - bass

References

Footnotes

Bibliography

Hank Williams albums
1951 debut albums